Farzaneh (Farzāneh, meaning wise, intelligent, or highly knowledgeable), also transliterated as Farzana, Farzona or Farzane, is a Persian given name for girls common in Iran, South Asia, and Central Asia. The masculine equivalent is Farzan.

Notable people with these names include:

As a given name
Farzona, Tajik poet and writer
Farzaneh Aghaeipour, Iranian playwright
Farzana Bari, Pakistani feminist, human rights activist and academic
Farzana Doctor, Canadian novelist and social worker
Farzaneh Fasihi, Iranian athlete
Farzana Hassan, Pakistani-Canadian author, speaker, and human rights activist
Farzana Hoque, Bangladeshi cricketer who plays for the Bangladesh national women's cricket team
Farzana Praveen, Pakistani woman murdered in 2014
Farzaneh Kaboli, Iranian dancer
Farzana Raja, Pakistani politician
Farzaneh Ta'idi, Iranian actress

As a surname
Paria Farzaneh, English-Iranian fashion designer
Sharlin Farzana, Bangladeshi model and actress

See also
Farjana
Ferezneh, village in Iran also Romanized as Farzaneh

Persian feminine given names